Eric Bross is an American film director. He has directed numerous films since 1995. He won the Directors Guild of America's Award for Outstanding Directorial Achievement in Children's Programs for The Boy Who Cried Werewolf (2010) on Nickelodeon. He also directed Traffic for USA Network (2004), the pilot episode for USA's Kojak series starring Ving Rhames and Michale Kelly (2005), and Affairs of State, with David Corenswet.

Bross grew up in West Caldwell, New Jersey. He was recognized at the New Jersey Young Filmmakers Festival just three years after receiving a Super 8 camera at the age of 13 and went on to study film at Montclair State University.

References

External links
 
 

Film directors from New Jersey
Living people
Montclair State University alumni
People from West Caldwell, New Jersey
Place of birth missing (living people)
Year of birth missing (living people)